A15, called in , is a motorway in Portugal, connecting Caldas da Rainha and Óbidos to Santarém via Rio Maior. The A15 is operated by Auto-Estradas do Atlântico. part of Brisa

The road carries very little traffic.

Exits

References

Motorways in Portugal